Morka was an inland town of ancient Pamphylia inhabited during Byzantine times.

Its site is tentatively located near Yeşilkaraman, in Asiatic Turkey.

References

Populated places in ancient Pamphylia
Former populated places in Turkey
Populated places of the Byzantine Empire
History of Antalya Province